Edward James Ryan was an American football player and coach. He served as the head football coach at Detroit College—now known as the University of Detroit Mercy for the 1902 and 1906 seasons, compiling a record  of 7–5–1. Ryan also coached at Ouachita Baptist University during the 1908 season and for Central High School in Detroit.

Ryan played college football at the University of Michigan and for many seasons with the Detroit Athletic Club.

Head coaching record

College

References

Year of death missing
Year of birth missing
19th-century players of American football
American football ends
Michigan Wolverines football players
Michigan Wolverines men's track and field athletes
Detroit Titans football coaches
Ouachita Baptist Tigers football coaches
High school football coaches in Michigan
Players of American football from Detroit
Coaches of American football from Michigan